is a retired Japanese male volleyball player. He was a part of the Japan men's national volleyball team. On club level, he played for Toyoda Gosei Trefuerza and then Wolf Dogs Nagoya.

His retirement was announced on March 7, 2021.

Personal life
Koga has younger brother, Taichiro Koga, who is a part of Japan men's national volleyball team as the same position.

References

External links
 profile at FIVB.org

1984 births
Living people
Japanese men's volleyball players
People from Nagasaki Prefecture
Sportspeople from Nagasaki Prefecture